Normandy University (Normandie université) is the association of universities and higher education institutions (ComUE) for institutions of higher education and research in the French regions of Lower Normandy and Upper Normandy.

The university was created as a ComUE according to the 2013 Law on Higher Education and Research (France), effective December 29, 2014.

Members 
Normandy University brings together the following institutions:

 University of Caen Lower Normandy
 University of Rouen
 University of Le Havre
 Institut national des sciences appliquées de Rouen
 École nationale supérieure d'ingénieurs de Caen
 École nationale supérieure d'architecture de Normandie
 XL-Chem Graduate School of Research

References

External links 
 Normandy University website

Universities in France
Universities and colleges formed by merger in France